Kahuna is a Hawaiian word that refers to an expert in any field. Historically, it has been used to refer to doctors, surgeons and dentists, as well as priests, ministers, and sorcerers.

Background 
A kahuna may be versed in agriculture, canoe building, or any other skill or knowledge area. A kahuna may be called on by the community to bless new buildings and construction projects or to officiate weddings.

Forty types of kahuna are listed in the book Tales from the Night Rainbow, twenty in the healing professions alone, including "Kahuna lapaau, medical priest or practitioner", and "Kahuna hāhā, an expert who diagnoses, as sickness or pain, by feeling the body".

There are two main categories of kahuna; craft kahuna, such as the kālai waa – an expert canoe maker, and hookele – an expert navigator; vs sorcery kahuna, such as kahuna anāanā and kahuna lapaau (healer).

Kahuna nui 
There are ten colleges or branches of the Hawaiian priesthood.
 Anāanā: one who "practices evil sorcery by means of prayer".
 Hoopiopio: a "[m]alevolent sorcerer, as one who inflicts illness by gesture, as rubbing his own head to give the victim a severe headache or head injury. Sometimes the victim might imitate the gesture and send the affliction back to the sorcerer."
 Hoounāunā: one who can send spirits to cause an illness.
 Hookomokomo:
 Poi Uhane: one who can catch a spirit and force it to do its bidding.
 Lapaau: one who practices procedures of medicinal healing.
 Kuhikuhi puuone (literally "to direct divination"): one who locates the site for the construction of heiau, or temples.
 kilokilo: one who divines and predicts future events, a prophet.
 Nānāuli: one who studies natural signs, like clouds, rains, and winds.

To master all ten made one a kahuna nui or high priest. Kahuna nui usually lived in places such as Waimea Valley, which is known as the "Valley of the Priests". They were given slices of land that spanned from the mountain to the sea. Hewahewa, a direct descendant of Paao, was a kahuna nui to Kamehameha I. A contemporary, Leimomi Mo'okini Lum is a Kahuna Nui. David Kaonohiokala Bray was a well-known kahuna.

King Kamehameha IV, in his translation of the Book of Common Prayer, used the term Kahuna to refer to Anglican priests, and Kahunapule to refer to both lay and ordained Anglican ministers.

Legal status 
Craft kahuna were never prohibited; however, during the decline of native Hawaiian culture, many died and did not pass on their wisdom to new students. As an example, when the Hōkūleʻa was built to be sailed to the South Pacific to prove the voyaging capabilities of the ancient Hawaiians, master navigator Mau Piailug from Satawal was brought to Hawaii to teach navigation to the Hawaiians.

After American missionaries went to Hawaii in 1820, they reportedly prohibited kahuna practices. But, in the 100 years after the missionaries arrived, all kahuna practices were legal until 1831, some were illegal until 1863, all were legal until 1887, and some were illegal until 1919. Since 1919, all have been legal, except sorcery. It was initially declared illegal, but it was decriminalized in 1972.

The first Christian missionaries arrived in 1820. Kaahumanu, one of the most powerful people in the Hawaiian nation, did not convert until 1825. Eleven years after missionaries arrived, she proclaimed laws against hula, chant, kava, and Hawaiian religion.

Non-Hawaiian uses

The term was used in the 1959 film Gidget, in which "The Big Kahuna", played by Cliff Robertson (Martin Milner in the TV episode), was the leader of a group of surfers. The figure of the Big Kahuna became commonplace in Beach Party films of the 1960s, such as Beach Blanket Bingo, in which the "Big Kahuna" was the best surfer on the beach. Hawaiian surfing master Duke Kahanamoku may have been referred to as the "Big Kahuna", but he rejected the term as he knew the original meaning.

In the New Age spiritual system known as Huna, which uses some Hawaiian words and concepts appropriated from Hawaiian tradition, kahuna denotes someone of priestly or shamanic standing. The prevalence of these works in pop culture has influenced definitions in English dictionaries, such as Merriam-Webster, which not only defines "kahuna" as "a preeminent person or thing" but also offers "Hawaiian shaman" as a secondary definition.

See also 
 Ancient Hawaii
 Kohala Historical Sites State Monument
 Ho'oponopono, Hawaiian forgiveness process
 Morrnah Simeona, regarded as a kahuna la'au lapa'au
 Tohunga, a cognate term and title in Māori tradition
 Babaylan, shamans in Filipino animism
 Bobohizan, shamans among the Kadazan-Dusun
 Big Kahuna Burger, a fictional chain of Hawaiian-themed fast food restaurants that appears in the movies of Quentin Tarantino
 Guru

References

Bibliography

 Chai, Makana Risser Na Mo'olelo Lomilomi: Traditions of Hawaiian Massage & Healing; 
 Hall, Sandra Duke: A Great Hawaiian; 
 Gutmanis, Jane: Kahuna La'au Lapa'au – Hawaiian Herbal Medicine [Medical Kahuna], Island Heritage (www.islandheritage.com), 1976, English, 
 Kahalewai, Nancy S. Hawaiian Lomilomi – Big Island Massage, 
 Kamakau, Samuel Tales & Traditions of the People of Old; 
 Kupihea, Moke: Kahuna of Light – The World of Hawaiian Spirituality, 2001, Inner Traditions International, 
 Lee, Pali Jae Hoopono and Tales from the Night Rainbow
 Malo, David: Hawaiian Antiquities (Moolelo Hawaii), Bishop Museum Press, 1951  (1903)
 The Kahuna: Versatile Masters of Old Hawaii von Likeke R. McBride, 
 Nana I Ke Kumu (Look to the source), by Mary K. Pukui, E. W. Haertig, Catharine A. Lee; # Publisher: Hui Hanai; (1980); 
 

 
Hawaiian words and phrases
Traditional healthcare occupations
Polynesian titles
Religious leadership roles
Austronesian spirituality